Grevillea saccata, commonly known as pouched grevillea, is a species of flowering plant in the family Proteaceae and is endemic to the south-west of Western Australia. It is a low, spreading to diffuse, scrambling or trailing shrub with linear to oblong or egg-shaped leaves with the narrower end towards the base, and small clusters of red and orange flowers with a lime-green style.

Description
The upper surface of the leaves is hairy, the edges are turned down or rolled under, and the lower surface is covered with shaggy hairs.

This grevillea is similar to G. fasciculata, G. crassifolia and G. depauperata.

Taxonomy
This species was formally described in 1870 by English botanist George Bentham in Flora Australiensis.
The specific epithet (saccata) is a Latin word meaning "pouched", referring to the base of the flowers.

Distribution
Pouched grevillea grows in woodland or open heath, sometimes in swampy places, in sandy to clayey soils on laterite and is restricted to the area between Mullering Brook in Badgingarra National Park, Dandaragan and just north of the Hill River, in the Geraldton Sandplains and the Swan Coastal Plain bioregions of south-western Western Australia.

Conservation statusGrevillea saccata'' is listed as "Priority Four" by the Government of Western Australia Department of Biodiversity, Conservation and Attractions, meaning that it is rare or near threatened.

See also
List of Grevillea species

References

saccata
Endemic flora of Western Australia
Eudicots of Western Australia
Proteales of Australia
Taxa named by George Bentham
Plants described in 1870